Stanley Herbert Polley (April 7, 1922 – July 20, 2009) was an American entertainment manager and fraudster active in the 1960s and 1970s. His clients included rock band Badfinger, musician Al Kooper, and singer Lou Christie. Throughout his career, Polley defrauded a number of clients and associates, most notably Badfinger.

Biography 
Polley was born on April 7, 1922 in New York City. After serving as a corporal in the U.S. Army during World War II, he practiced law and worked in retail shops before beginning his managerial career in New York's garment industry. He began artist management after he met Lou Christie in the mid-1960s. It was through his association with Christie that he met and began working with other artists in the New York and Los Angeles entertainment fields.

In 1968, Polley formed a company called Five Arts Management, for his work with singer Lou Christie, musician Al Kooper, arranger Charles Calello, TV director Michael Cooper, composer Sandy Linzer and WABC disc jockey Bob Lewis. He formed further companies for legal and accounting purposes to manage artists including composers Irwin Levine and Larry Brown. In 1970, Polley registered Badfinger Enterprises, Inc. as a corporate entity for management of the British rock group Badfinger, which had no American representation at the time.

In 1971, Polley was named during US Senate investigation hearings as an intermediary between unnamed crime figures and a New York Supreme Court judge. Most of Polley's American clients said they were already suspicious of their manager by this point, but the publicity of the hearings convinced several to sever ties with him.

The following year, in 1972, Polley negotiated a record contract with Warner Bros. Records for Badfinger, which called for advances to be paid into an escrow account. In 1974, Warner's publishing division filed a lawsuit against Polley when it was unsuccessful in locating the funds. The legal morass crippled Badfinger financially; band leader Pete Ham died by suicide on April 24, 1975, leaving behind a note directly blaming Polley for his financial ruin. Bandmate Tom Evans died by suicide on November 19, 1983.

In 1991, Polley pleaded no contest to charges of misappropriating funds and money laundering in Riverside County, California. Aeronautics engineer Peter Brock accused Polley of swindling him out of $250,000 after the two set up a corporation to manufacture airplane engines. Polley was placed on probation for five years and ordered by the court to return all missing funds to Brock, although the complainant said the restitution never materialized.

Polley died in Rancho Mirage, California, on July 20, 2009. He is interred in the Riverside National Cemetery in Riverside, California.

Clients 
Polley's clients included singer-producer Hank Medress, the rock band Badfinger, musician Al Kooper, singer Lou Christie, Michael Cooper, Charles Calello, Sandy Linzer and Bob Lewis. Multiple financial dealings by Polley were found to be irregular and to the detriment of his clients, scamming them and causing the acts to fall apart.

References

Sources 

1922 births
2009 deaths
American money launderers
American music managers
American fraudsters
American male criminals
Badfinger
Businesspeople from New York City
Burials at Riverside National Cemetery
Criminals from New York City
United States Army personnel of World War II
20th-century American Jews
21st-century American Jews